Eupithecia alticomora is a moth in the  family Geometridae. It is found on the Comoros.

References

Moths described in 1981
alticomora
Moths of Africa